The fourth season of Nip/Tuck premiered on September 5, 2006 and concluded on December 12, 2006. It consisted of 15 episodes.

Cast and characters

Main cast
 Dylan Walsh as Dr. Sean McNamara
 Julian McMahon as Dr. Christian Troy
 John Hensley as Matt McNamara
 Roma Maffia as Liz Cruz
 Kelly Carlson as Kimber Henry
 Joely Richardson as Julia McNamara

Special guest stars

Recurring cast

Episodes

U.S television ratings

Reception
The fourth season received positive reviews from critics, holding a 71% fresh rating on Rotten Tomatoes. Maria Elena Fernandez of the Los Angeles Times wrote "Perhaps the show's continued success can be attributed to its restless energy and how in one hour it offers a taste of several different genres, mixing the real with the outrageous", whilst Brian Lowry wrote for Variety, "As always, the series manages to glorify surface beauty while subjecting society's obsession with it to a harsh glare, holding up the strange cases that waltz in as a mirror to the Sean-Julia-Christian triangle. The dialogue remains biting as well." Maureen Ryan of the Chicago Tribune praised the character development, writing "That sense of saucy transgression married to surprisingly effective character development – the magic formula of the first two seasons – is a bit wobbly this year, but Nip/Tuck is more or less back on track." Some reviews were less favorable, with Joe Reid of The Atlantic writing "This stretch of Nip/Tuck was just uninspired ... [It has] its own urban-legend charm, but all the main characters were seriously spinning their wheels", whilst other critics argued the show did not live up to the quality of previous seasons and criticized many imbued scenes.

References

Nip/Tuck
2006 American television seasons